Sugar Corporation of Uganda Limited (SCOUL) is a sugar manufacturer in Uganda, the third-largest economy in the East African Community.

Overview
SCOUL is the third-largest manufacturer of sugar in Uganda, producing an estimated 60,000 metric tonnes annually, accounting for approximately 17 percent of national output. Its sugar is marketed in Uganda, Kenya, Tanzania, Rwanda, Burundi, the Democratic Republic of the Congo, and South Sudan. According to a 2010 published report, SCOUL was undergoing renovations and expansion to increase output to 100,000 metric tonnes annually by 2013.

History
Nanji Kalidas Mehta is the founder of the Mehta Group of Companies, a Mumbai-based conglomerate, with business interests in Asia, Africa, Europe, and North America.

In 1900, at age thirteen, he left his native India and sailed to Eastern Africa, settling in Uganda near the town of Lugazi, Buikwe District in the Central Region. Over the next thirty to forty years Mehta travelled between India and East Africa 46 times. He established in Uganda cotton ginneries, a sugar plantation, a sugar factory, tea plantations, and coffee plantations. The sugar factory, established in 1924, eventually became SCOUL.

Location
The coordinates of the SCOUL factory are 0°22'59.0"N, 32°56'27.0"E (Latitude:0.383056; Longitude:32.940833).

Ownership
SCOUL is a subsidiary of the Mehta Group, a diversified industrial and investment conglomerate based in Mumbai, employing over 10,000 people in Asia, Africa, Europe, and North America. , the shareholding in SCOUL was as depicted in the table below:

See also
 selling and buying of shares
 Lugazi Power Station
 Buikwe District
 Economy of Uganda
 List of sugar manufacturers in Uganda

References

External links
  Uganda's Total Annual Sugar Production To Hit 350,000 Metric Tonnes In 2011
  Website of Mehta Group of Companies

Sugar companies of Uganda
Buikwe District
Central Region, Uganda
Food and drink companies established in 1924
1920s establishments in Uganda
1924 establishments in Africa